Potassium sulfide is an inorganic compound with the formula K2S.  The colourless solid is rarely encountered, because it reacts readily with water, a reaction that affords potassium hydrosulfide (KSH) and potassium hydroxide (KOH). Most commonly, the term potassium sulfide refers loosely to this mixture, not the anhydrous solid.

Structure
It adopts "antifluorite structure," which means that the small K+ ions occupy the tetrahedral (F−) sites in fluorite, and the larger S2− centers occupy the eight-coordinate sites.  Li2S, Na2S, and Rb2S crystallize similarly.

Synthesis and reactions
It can be produced by heating K2SO4 with carbon (coke):
K2SO4  +  4 C  →  K2S  +  4 CO
In the laboratory, pure K2S may be prepared by the reaction of potassium and sulfur in anhydrous ammonia. 

Sulfide is highly basic, consequently K2S completely and irreversibly hydrolyzes in water according to the following equation:
K2S  +  H2O  →  KOH  +  KSH

For many purposes, this reaction is inconsequential since the mixture of SH− and OH− behaves as a source of S2−.  Other alkali metal sulfides behave similarly.

Use in fireworks
Potassium sulfides are formed when black powder is burned and are important intermediates in many pyrotechnic effects, such as senko hanabi and some glitter formulations.

See also
Liver of sulfur

References

Potassium compounds
Sulfides
Inorganic compounds
Fluorite crystal structure